Harrison Gray Otis Blake (March 17, 1818 – April 16, 1876) was a U.S. Representative from Ohio.

Born in Newfane, Vermont, Blake moved to Salem, New York, and in 1830 to Guilford, Ohio. He received his education at public schools, later studying medicine at Seville for one year. In 1836, he moved to Medina, where he engaged in mercantile pursuits and studied law. He was admitted to the bar and commenced practice in Medina. From 1846 to 1847, he served as a member of the Ohio House of Representatives, and was elected to the Ohio State Senate in 1848, serving as that chamber's president.

Blake was elected as a Republican to the 36th United States Congress to fill the vacancy caused by the death of Cyrus Spink, formerly Representative for Ohio's 14th congressional district. He was reelected to that Congress, serving from October 11, 1859, to March 3, 1863. He was not a candidate for renomination in 1862 to the Thirty-eighth Congress, but instead, with the Civil War raging, entered the United States Army in 1864. He served as colonel of the 166th Ohio Infantry, a Hundred Days Regiment. Blake was mayor of Medina from 1870 to 1872.

After the war, he declined the appointment of Governor of Idaho Territory, resuming the practice of law and maintaining an interest in banking and mercantile pursuits. He served as delegate to the Loyalist Convention at Philadelphia in 1866, and died ten years later in Medina, Ohio, on April 16, 1876. He was interred in Spring Grove Cemetery.

Sources

1818 births
1876 deaths
People from Newfane, Vermont
Republican Party members of the United States House of Representatives from Ohio
People from Medina, Ohio
Presidents of the Ohio State Senate
Republican Party Ohio state senators
People from Salem, New York
19th-century American politicians